Herman Vogt (born 9 March 1976 in Drammen) is a Norwegian contemporary composer.

Vogt studied composition at the Norwegian Academy of Music under the tutorship of Lasse Thoresen, Olav Anton Thommessen, Henrik Hellstenius and Bjørn Kruse. He has also studied at the Royal Conservatory of The Hague with Martijn Padding and Louis Andriessen. From 1995 to 1997, Vogt studied violin at the Norwegian Academy of Music in Oslo. Vogt has also completed individual mentoring sessions and masterclasses with composers such as Salvatore Sciarrino, Walter Zimmermann, Helmut Lachenmann, Brian Ferneyhough, Klas Thorstensson and Diana Burrell.

Vogt’s works has seen performances by such ensembles, orchestras and performers as the Norwegian Radio Orchestra, Oslo Sinfonietta, BIT20 Ensemble, Poing, the Oslo Philharmonic Orchestra, Geir Inge Lotsberg, Ian Pace Kristian Lindberg, Rolf Borch as well as conductors Pierre-André Valade, Christian Eggen, Per Kristian Skalstad, Peter Szilvay, and Baldur Brönniman. His works have been featured at festivals Ultima Oslo Contemporary Music Festival, Nordic Music Days, Oslo Chamber Music Festival, the Borealis Festival in Bergen, Johan Halvorsen Music Fest, Valdres Sommersymfoni and the UNM Festival. Internationally, his works have been featured by the Athelas Sinfonietta in Copenhagen, Ensemble UNKO in Helsinki and at the 2010 and 2012 ISCM World Music Days.

Production

Selected works
 Moebius Band (2017)
 Ré-sur-Ré...exit (2016)
 String Quartet (2017)
 Three Spheres : for clarinet in Bb, cello and piano (2017)
 Cello Concerto (2014),
 The Marvel of Turin for solo organ (2012)
 Sonata in D for Violin and Piano (2012)
 Violin Concerto (2012/2015)
 Missa Brevis (2011) 
 Concordia Discors, Etudes nos. 1-12 for Solo Piano (2006–2015)
 Vanishing Points (2009)
 Sonata in A for Solo Violin (2009)
 Escher Triptych (2009)
 Wenn alle Länder wüsst lägen... (2008/2010)
 Piano Trio (2006)
 Die liebe Farbe (2005)
 Danksagung an den Bach for Soprano solo and ensemble (2004)
 Kazbek for orchestra (2002)

Discography
 Herman Vogt: Violin Concerto (2016), with Geir Inge Lotsberg, Bjarte Engeset & the Norwegian Radio Orchestra

References

External links
List of works supplied by the National Library of Norway

1976 births
21st-century classical composers
Living people
Norwegian contemporary classical composers
Norwegian male classical composers
Norwegian Academy of Music alumni
21st-century Norwegian male musicians